Phumlani is a South African given name that may refer to
Phumlani Dlamini (born 1988), Swaziland football defender 
Phumlani Mgobhozi (born 1978), Maskanda artist from South Africa
Phumlani Nodikida (born 1978), South African rugby union player
Phumlani Ntshangase (born 1994), South African football midfielder